The Overstreet Mall is a series of pedestrian bridges in Uptown Charlotte. Proposed in 1971 and completed around 1977, the design was based on the design of the Milan Galleria and the Montreal Place Ville-Maria.

Rodney Little of Little & Co. said that in 1975, based on a Minneapolis design, was expected to be a big success as concern began about retailers moving to the suburbs. For this reason, Southern National Center did not face a major street, but was intended to be part of a network of bridges between office buildings and major stores such as Belk and Ivey's. Another reason for locating along College Street was the concern Tryon Street would run out of space.  However, in the 1980s, the Charlotte City Council decided to limit additional walkways, and the uptown Belk and Ivey's closed by the end of the decade.

Connected facilities
11 buildings are connected through the Overstreet Mall; this includes seven hotels, nine parking garages, and three light rail/streetcar stations.

Bank of America Center
Ritz-Carlton
Bank of America Corporate Center
Blumenthal Performing Arts Center
Founders Hall
BB&T Center
Charlotte Plaza
EpiCentre
AC Hotel
Aloft Hotel
Residence Inn
One South at The Plaza
Omni Hotel
One Wells Fargo Center
Hilton Hotel
South Tryon Square
Marriott Courtyard
Three Wells Fargo Center
Truist Center
Two Wells Fargo Center

References

Shopping malls in Charlotte, North Carolina
Pedestrian bridges in North Carolina
Skyways